Rudolf Šmejkal (14 January 1915 – 8 November 1972) was a footballer who played international football for both Bohemia and Moravia and Czechoslovakia.

References

External links

1915 births
1972 deaths
Czechoslovak footballers
Czechoslovakia international footballers
Dual internationalists (football)
Association football midfielders